Thomas Edgar Smith (born 30 July 1959, in Wolverhampton) is an English former professional footballer who played as a striker in the Football League for Sheffield United, and Huddersfield Town. Smith also played non-league football for Bromsgrove Rovers, and Emley.

References

1959 births
Living people
Footballers from Wolverhampton
English footballers
Association football forwards
Bromsgrove Rovers F.C. players
Sheffield United F.C. players
Huddersfield Town A.F.C. players
Wakefield F.C. players
English Football League players